Hokkaido Aerospace Science and Technology Incubation Center ( HASTIC ) is a network of space development- related facilities and space-related university laboratories scattered throughout Hokkaido to create and start a new industry utilizing space development technology. HASTIC is a private space organization whose main purpose is to contribute to the development of space development in Japan and foster the next generation of researchers and engineers.

Overview 
HASTIC was established as a voluntary organization in June 2002, and was approved as a nonprofit organisation in January 2003 with offices in Kita-ku, Sapporo.

HASTIC conducts research and development in five main areas;

 Sounding rocket launches
 Satellite remote sensing
 Space environment utilization (50m drop tower)
 Solid rocket propellant
 Space medicine
 Small uncrewed supersonic aircraft

In addition, HASTIC holds seminars, conducts academic societies, and publishes the public relations magazine "HASTIC News" and "Space News Hokkaido".

References

External links
Dominant Narratives of Colonial Hokkaido and Imperial Japan: Envisioning the Periphery and the Modern Nation-State by M. Mason
National Regulation of Space Activities by R. S. Jakhu

Hokkaido
Space technology research institutes